Kota Kinabalu in northern Borneo of Sabah is one of the main cities of Malaysia, being one of the important economic centre for East Malaysia.

Kota Kinabalu is home to most of the tallest buildings in Borneo Island, including the 56-storey Jesselton Twin Towers & the upcoming 59-storey KK ONE.

Overview 
Kota Kinabalu, formerly known as Jesselton under the British protectorate of North Borneo and its successor the Crown Colony of North Borneo under the Crown colony government of the United Kingdom, the city has been undergoing rapid development ever since its devastation through the World War II bombings where only three buildings were left standing. 

The city urbanised area today encompasses the wide area of Greater Kota Kinabalu which goes beyond the city boundary on the south side into two West Coast districts of Penampang and Putatan, and to a lesser but growing extent into the districts of Papar (38 kilometres to the south) and Tuaran (34 kilometres to the north).

Tallest buildings completed or topped out 
The list are high-rise buildings  and skyscrapers in Kota Kinabalu  that are 20-storey and above.

Buildings under construction

Buildings under planning status

Buildings on hold

See also 
 List of tallest buildings in Malaysia
 List of tallest buildings in Kuala Lumpur
 List of tallest buildings in George Town
 List of tallest buildings in Johor Bahru

References 

Kota Kinabalu